TY Pyxidis is an eclipsing binary star in the constellation Pyxis. The apparent magnitude ranges from 6.85 to 7.5 over 3.2 days.

The two components are both of spectral type G5IV, have a mass of 1.2 solar masses and revolve around each other every 3.2 days. Each star is around 2.2 times the diameter of the Sun.

The system is classified as either a RS Canum Venaticorum variable or a BY Draconis variable, stars that vary on account of prominent starspot activity, and lies 184 ± 5 light years away. The system emits X-rays, and analysing the emission curve over time led Pres and colleagues to conclude that there was a loop of material arcing between the two stars.

References

Pyxis (constellation)
BY Draconis variables
RS Canum Venaticorum variables
Durchmusterung objects
044164
077137
G-type subgiants
Pyxidis, TY